Devata is a 1965 Indian Telugu-language drama film, produced by B. Purushottam, presented by comedian Padmanabham and directed by K. Hemambharadhara Rao. It stars N. T. Rama Rao and Savitri, with music composed by S. P. Kodandapani.

Plot
Lecturer Prasad and Seeta are a happily married couple. They have a son Madhu. Seeta is a dedicated daughter-in-law who cares for her in-laws. She learns that her father Seshaiah is sick and starts home by train. The train meets with an accident. Family members rush to the hospital where the occupants were taken and consult the officials, who were in charge of identifying the dead and treating the survivors, among the occupants of the train accident and are relieved to find out that Seeta is injured but alive and rejoice. She reaches home, but is unable to identify any of them. Meanwhile, Seshaiah leaves his entire property in the name of Seeta and dies. Dr. Rukminamma is called for consultation. The Doctor theorizes that the lady in the family is not Seeta but another lady of the same face, Lalitha. Prasad requests Lalitha to reveal her origin. Lalitha is a poor lady who loved a young man named Ramesh, who refused her proposal of their marriage for want of dowry. Meanwhile, she is being forced by her parents to marry a wealthy drunkard. Helpless, Lalitha decides to kill herself at the tracks where the same train in which Seeta is travelling, but she survives as the train derails just before reaching her allowing her to survive, albeit, with a few injuries. Prasad requests Lalitha to act like Seeta, until he finds Seeta, for his family's sake. It turns out that Seeta in fact died in the train accident and no one could come forward to identify Seeta at the time of the accident since everyone mistook Lalitha for Seeta. The officials hence buried Seeta, unidentified. Prasad, thus, decides to arrange Lalitha's marriage with Ramesh by giving the dowry, but Ramesh suspects a relation between Prasad and Lalitha. Hearing this, Lalitha refuses the marriage and asks Ramesh to get out. Simultaneously, Seeta's relative Jagannadham kidnaps Lalitha for the property, but she is saved by Prasad. Taking into account the affection shown on her by the family, Lalitha decides to replace Seeta and marries Prasad, keeping everyone happy.

Cast

 N. T. Rama Rao as Prasad
 Savitri as Seeta and Lalitha
 V. Nagayya as Lokabhiramaiah
 Rajanala as Jagannatham
 Padmanabham as Varahalu / Prem Kumar
 Vallam Narasimha Rao as Ramesh
 Vangara as Anjaneyulu
 Perumallu as Sheshaiah
 Balakrishna
 Geetanjali as Hema
 Hemalatha
 Nirmalamma as Parvatamma
 Master Murali as Madhu

Cameo appearances
 S. V. Ranga Rao as himself 
 Gummadi as himself 
 Relangi as himself 
 Ramana Reddy as himself 
 Kanta Rao as himself 
 Raja Babu 
 Nagesh
 Anjali Devi as herself 
 Krishna Kumari as herself 
 Jamuna as herself
 Sowcar Janaki as herself 
 Vanisri

Soundtrack

Music composed by S. P. Kodandapani.

Production
Veeturi wrote this story for a drama company called Rekha and Murali Arts. Later everyone involved thought that the story was not suitable for a stage drama as the heroine of the story has to perform a dual role. It was felt that the story was suitable for a motion picture. Padmanabham took up the task of producing the film under the banner Rekha & Murali Arts with the support from Kakarla Venkateswarlu of Vani film distributors. Padmanabhan mortgaged his house for Rs. 40,000 for the initial capital. Most of the shooting was done in Vauhini Studios, Chennai in three months.
 Vanisri acted as a guest in the college anniversary festival song "Naaku Neeve Kaavalera". 
 Master Murali acted as Madhu, son of Prasad and Seeta. He is the eldest son of B. Padmanabham.
 Padmanabham portrayed the character as Varahalu, who is crazy about films and film actors. In the film, he visits Madras to personally meet many famous film actors of that time.
 Vallam Narasimha Rao, one of the partners in Rekha and Murali Arts has acted in the film as the lover of Savitri.

References

External links
 

Indian drama films
1960s Telugu-language films
1965 drama films
1965 films
Films scored by S. P. Kodandapani